Otello Capitani (17 March 1890 – 20 September 1912) was an Italian gymnast. He competed in the men's artistic individual all-around event at the 1908 Summer Olympics. He was killed in action during the Italo-Turkish War.

References

1890 births
1912 deaths
Italian male artistic gymnasts
Olympic gymnasts of Italy
Gymnasts at the 1908 Summer Olympics
Sportspeople from Modena
Italian military personnel killed in action
People of the Italo-Turkish War
Olympians killed in warfare